Mattie is a given name and nickname, used for people with names such as Matthew, Matthea, Matilda, or Martha.

People
 Mattie Blaylock (1850–1888), common-law wife of the American lawman Wyatt Earp
 Mattie Moss Clark (1925–1994), American gospel choir director and mother of the Clark Sisters gospel group
 Mattie Curry (1924–1964), Canadian missionary
 Mattie Belle Davis (1910–2004), American judge
 Mattie Daughtry, American politician elected to the Maine House of Representatives in 2012
 Mattie Delaney, American delta blues singer and guitarist
Mattie Donnelly (hurler), Irish hurler
Mattie Donnelly (Gaelic footballer), Irish Gaelic football player
 Mattie Forde, Irish Gaelic footballer
 Mattie Griffith Browne (c. 1825–1906), American suffragist
 Mattie Hunter (born 1954), American politician
 Mattie Kenny (born 1964), Irish former hurler and manager
 Mattie McDonagh (1936–2005), Gaelic footballer
 Mattie McGrath (born 1958), Irish politician
 Mattie Murphy, Irish hurling manager and former player, the latter in the 1970s and '80s
 Mattie Stepanek (1990–2004), American poet and peace advocate

Fictional characters
 Spider-Woman (Mattie Franklin), a Marvel Comics superhero
 Mattie Ross, a character in the novel True Grit and the film adaptations
 Mattie Silver, in the novel Ethan Frome
 Mattie Storin, in the British television series House of Cards
 Mattie Jensen, in the Nancy Drew book and HerInteractive PC game Stay Tuned for Danger

See also
 Matty (name)
 Matti (given name)